The Norwood-North Football Association (NNFA) was an Australian rules football competition based in the eastern and north-eastern suburbs of Adelaide, South Australia until it folded at the end of the 1977 season. It was formed in 1969 as a merger of the East Torrens Football Association and the North Adelaide District Football Association.

Member Clubs

East Torrens Clubs

North Adelaide District Clubs

Other Clubs

Disbanding 
At the end of the 1977 season, the stronger clubs joined the newly formed South Australian Football Association whilst the weaker clubs joined the Adelaide and Suburban Football Association.

Clubs to SAFA 
 Athelstone 
 Burnside 
 Campbelltown-Magill United
 Gepps Cross
 Hectorville
 Hope Valley
 Ingle Farm
 Modbury
 Norwood Union 
 Pooraka
 Tea Tree Gully

Clubs to ASFA 
 Albert Druids
 Brompton
 Kensington Gardens
 Ovingham United
 Para-Houghton 
 Taperoo  
 Wingfield 
 Woodville Royal

Premierships

References 

1969 establishments in Australia
1977 disestablishments in Australia
Defunct Australian rules football competitions in South Australia